Wuhan, I Am Here (汉语: 武汉，我在） is a 2021 documentary film directed and written by Lan Bo, and produced by Archibald Pei. It records how a fiction film crew, unexpectedly detained in Wuhan due to the 2020 COVID-19 pandemic outbreak, followed local volunteers to save the non-COVID patients and ordinary citizens. 

The film is a development on the director's 2020 short film "Wuhan: The Long Night" and was screened on Yamagata International Documentary Film Festival (YIDFF) 2021, as that year's only Special Invitation Film.

Reception 

"Our daily lives have been forever changed by the realities of the global COVID-19 pandemic. Wuhan, I Am Here sheds light on the reality that continues from 2020 to this day."
——YIDFF Official Website

References

External links
 
 Special Invitation Film, YIDFF 2021

2021 documentary films
Documentary films about the COVID-19 pandemic